The Twentieth Century Approaches is a 1986 Soviet film adaptation of Arthur Conan Doyle's stories about Sherlock Holmes. It is the fifth and final film in The Adventures of Sherlock Holmes and Dr. Watson film series directed by Igor Maslennikov.

The film is based on four stories by Conan Doyle – "The Adventure of the Engineer's Thumb", "The Adventure of the Second Stain", "The Adventure of the Bruce-Partington Plans", and "His Last Bow".

Cast
 Vasily Livanov as Sherlock Holmes
 Vitaly Solomin as Dr. Watson
 Rina Zelyonaya as Mrs. Hudson (uncredited)
 Borislav Brondukov as Inspector Lestrade (voiced by Igor Yefimov)
 Boris Klyuyev as Mycroft Holmes
 Innokenti Smoktunovsky as Prime Minister Lord Thomas Bellinger
 Aleksandr Romantsov as Sir Trelawney Hope, European Minister
 Yelena Safonova as Lady Hilda Trelawney-Hope
 Larisa Guzeyeva as Ma'am Anry Furnie
 Viktor Koretsky as Victor Hederly, Hydraulic Engineer
 Yevgeni Platokhin as Eduardo Lukas
 Yekaterina Zinchenko as Mrs. Watson
 Konstantin Vorobyov as Inspector Pitkin
 Maris Liepa as Colonel Valentine Walter
 Mikhail Morozov as Smith
 Vladimir Tatosov as Baron von Herling
 Leonid Kuravlyov as Von Bork (uncredited)

References

External links

1986 films
1980s Russian-language films
Sherlock Holmes films based on works by Arthur Conan Doyle
Lenfilm films
Soviet television miniseries
Films directed by Igor Maslennikov
1980s crime films
1980s Soviet television series
Soviet crime films
Russian crime films
Russian mystery films
1980s television miniseries
Soviet crime television series